Big Brother Naija Season 7 also known as Big Brother Naija: Level Up was the seventh season of the Nigerian version of the reality show Big Brother. It premiered on 23 and 24 July 2022 on DStv channel 198/199 and GOtv channel 8/29. Ebuka Obi-Uchendu returned as the host for the 6th consecutive time.

The headline sponsor of the show was Pocket by Piggyvest and the associate sponsor was Flutterwave.

According to the organizers of the show MultiChoice, the winner of the season is expected to win a total of ₦100 million grand prize which includes a N50m cash prize and ₦50m worth of prizes from sponsors.

Auditions
A virtual audition was held to select contestants for the show on 15 May 2022 to 30 May 2022. Interested contestants were told to record and submit a three-minute video stating why they should appear on the show.

Housemates 

The 1st launch night (23 July) is marked as Day 0A. The 2nd launch night (24 July) is marked as Day 0B. The day after is Day 1.

Voting history & nominations table 
 Housemates in Level 1 of the Big Brother House (Weeks 1-4).
 Housemates in Level 2 of the Big Brother House (Weeks 1-4).

Notes

 : During the 2nd launch night on the 24th of July, 2022, Ebuka announced that there would be 2 levels of the Big Brother House. The first 12 housemates would occupy the Level 2 house, while the last 12 housemates would occupy the Level 1 house.
 : In the Head of House games, Big Brother announced to the housemates that only the Head of House was to nominate for the week. However, when the time came for the HOH to make his nomination, Big Brother revealed that there would be no nominations, but it had to be kept secret to the rest of the house.
 : On the Sunday Live Show on the 31st of July, 2022, 2 fake housemates, Deji and Modella joined the season of Big Brother Naija. Fake housemates can't be nominated and only Big Brother can walk them out of the house.
 : The HOH once again was the only person who could nominate for Weeks 2-4.
 : Unlike previous weeks, the Head of House had to nominate 7 housemates instead of 5.
 : On day 14, Beauty got ejected from the show due to repeatedly flouting the rules.
 : On the Sunday Live Show on the 7th of August, 2022, 2 new housemates, known as "The Riders" joined the season of Big Brother Naija: Chizzy and Rachel. According to Ebuka, "The Riders" are basically Big Brother's agents, so they can't win the grand prize. However, they can partake in all activities in the house, can't be evicted and will play until the end.
 : On Day 26, Deji and Groovy swapped levels, i.e. Deji moved to Level 2 and Groovy moved to Level 1.
 : On the Sunday Live Show on the 21st of August, 2022, it was announced that the Levels were scrapped. This meant that as from Week 5, the housemates had to compete under one house.
 : On Day 29, Ebuka announced that all nominations for Week 5 were fake.
 : On Day 36, it was announced that they would nominate for immediate eviction by Big Brother. Having the most votes by real housemates, Amaka was evicted. Then, all housemates except the HOH were to be against public voting.
 : On day 43, the housemates had to vote for three housemates instead of two. Also, the Riders could not nominate.
 : On the Sunday Live Show on the 11th of September, 2022, Ebuka announced a new level, called Level 3, where, as from that night, evicted housemates would move to. Evicted housemates, now referred to as House Guests, can no longer compete for the grand prize, but can partake in all house activities except the Head of House games, and are also eligible to earn winnings from sponsored tasks.

References

Big Brother (franchise) seasons
2022 Nigerian television seasons